Events from the year 1822 in France.

Incumbents
 Monarch – Louis XVIII
 Prime Minister – Joseph de Villèle

Events
20 October - Congress of Verona, at which Russia, Austria and Prussia approve French intervention in Spain.

 Hieroglyphs deciphered by Thomas Young and Jean-François Champollion using the Rosetta Stone.

Births
8 February - Maxime Du Camp, writer and photographer (died 1894)
4 March - Jules Antoine Lissajous, mathematician (died 1880)
8 March - Charles Frédéric Girard, biologist (died 1895)
11 March - Joseph Louis François Bertrand, mathematician (died 1900)
7 May - André Garin, missionary and parish priest (died 1895)
20 May - Frédéric Passy, economist, joint winner (with Henry Dunant) of first Nobel Peace Prize, 1901 (died 1912)
26 May - Edmond de Goncourt, writer, critic and book publisher (died 1896)
13 September - Maurice Jean Auguste Girard, entomologist (died 1886)
19 October - Louis-Nicolas Ménard, man of letters (died 1901)
27 December - Louis Pasteur, chemist and microbiologist (died 1895)

Full date unknown
Delphine Delamare, housewife and suicide (died 1848)
Gabriel-Hippolyte Destailleur, architect (died 1893)

Deaths
3 March - Abraham-Joseph Bénard, actor (born 1750)
19 March - Valentin Haüy, founder of the first school for the blind (born 1745)
10 May - Roch-Ambroise Cucurron Sicard, abbé and instructor of deaf-mutes (born 1742)
3 June - René Just Haüy, mineralogist (born 1743)
2 August - Thomas de Treil de Pardailhan, nobleman and soldier (born 1754)
18 August - Armand-Charles Caraffe, historical painter and etcher (born 1762)
19 August - Jean Baptiste Joseph Delambre, mathematician and astronomer (born 1749)
16 September - Auguste Jean Ameil, Brigade General (born 1776)
6 November - Claude Louis Berthollet, chemist and senator (born 1748)
10 December - Bertrand Andrieu, medal engraver (born 1761)

Full date unknown
 Marie-Catherine de Maraise, businesswoman (born 1737)

References

See also

1820s in France